This list of mines in Japan is subsidiary to the list of mines article and lists working, defunct and future mines in the country. For practical purposes stone, marble and other quarries may be included in this list. This list is inherently incomplete and shows only a selection of the most notable mines.

 Copper 
 Iron (triangle mark)
 Gold/Silver 
 Alkali/bases  
 Lanthanide/Actinide 
 other metals 
 Coal, oil or oil slate 
 Chalcogen/Halogen 
 other non-metal 
 stone, crystals and complex compounds

List of mines in Japan

References

External links
Mining wiki
MINERAL DEPOSIT DATA OF MINERAL RESOURCES MAP OF EAST ASIA(2007)
Geological Survey of Japan site
Interactive geological map of Japan

 
Japan
Mines